The Battenberg Cup is an award given annually as a symbol of operational excellence to the best ship or submarine in the United States Navy Atlantic Fleet. The cup was originally awarded as a trophy to the winner of cutter or longboat rowing competitions between crews of American and British naval ships. In more recent years it has been presented to the Battle Efficiency "E" winner selected as the best all-around ship of the Fleet based on crew achievements. These include performance in competition for Atlantic Fleet Sportsmanship Award, TYCOM Sailor of the Year Award, Golden Anchor Award (for retention), Captain Edward F. Ney Memorial Award (for food service), and command excellence awards. Other information, such as operating schedules, commitments and unusual factors contributing to the nomination may also be considered.

History
In 1905, Prince Louis of Battenberg, commanding the five ships of the Royal Navy's 2nd Cruiser Squadron, visited the United States, making port visits in New York City, Annapolis and Washington, D.C. Shortly after his return to England, Battenberg sent the cup to Rear Admiral Robley Evans who at the time commanded the US North Atlantic Fleet. Battenberg requested the trophy become a challenge cup between enlisted men of the two navies. The challenge rules were set up for cutter racing, including a provision that British sailors could compete with their American counterparts "whenever a ship holding the cup would fall in with a British Man-O-War." Only once in 34 years of competition (in 1907 during the Jamestown Exposition in Norfolk, Virginia) and 52 challenges did the Americans lose the cup to the British.

The rowing competition was discontinued due to World War II and never resumed. The cup was present at the attack on Pearl Harbor on 7 December 1941 aboard , the last ship to win the cup. It survived the sinking of the West Virginia during the attack and remained aboard as she was raised, refitted and returned to the war. The ship retained custody of the cup until her decommissioning in 1947 when the cup was displayed at several Navy commands. It was eventually placed in the Navy Memorial Museum in Washington, D.C. until the competition reemerged in 1978 with new criteria.

In grateful remembrance of the many kindnesses, tokens of good fellowship and wonderful entertainments that were given to them in cordial friendship by their comrades across the sea." It features the crossed ensigns of the US Navy and Royal Navy.

Winners
2021 - 

2020 - 
2019 – 
2018 – 
2017 – 
2016 – 
2015 – 
2014 – 
2013 – 
2012 – 
2011 – 
2010 – 
2009 – 
2008 – 
2007 – 
2006 – 
2005 – 
2004 – 
2003 – 
2002 – 
2001 – 
2000 – 
1999 – 
1998 – 
1997 – 
1996 – 
1995 – 
1994 – 
1993 – 
1992 – 
1991 – 
1988 – 
1986 – 
1985 – 
1983 – 
1982 – 
1980 – 
1979 – 
1978 – 
1978 – 
1941–1977 – NO AWARD

1940 – 
1939 – 
1937 – 
1936 – 
1935 – 
1934 – 

1931 – 
1929 – 
1928 October – 
1928 March – 
1927 October – 
1920 – 
1919 – 
1918 – 
1909 – 
1907 – 
1906 –

References

Bibliography
 Stillwell, Paul. Battleship Arizona; An Illustrated History. Annapolis, Maryland: Naval Institute Press, 1991. . .

Awards established in 1905
American awards
Awards and decorations of the United States Navy
1905 establishments in the United States